Bram de Groot (born 18 December 1974 in Alkmaar) is a Dutch former professional road bicycle racer who last rode for UCI ProTour team .

Major results

 Uniqa Classic - Overall (2005)
 Delta Ronde van Midden-Zeeland (2005)
 Volta a Catalunya - 1 stage (2003)
 Tour Méditerranéen - 1 stage (2003)
 Circuito Montañés - 1 stage (1999)

External links 
 

1974 births
Living people
Dutch male cyclists
Sportspeople from Alkmaar
UCI Road World Championships cyclists for the Netherlands
Cyclists from North Holland